Ealing East was one of two and a minority of a third constituency covering the Municipal Borough of Ealing in Middlesex, 1945 – 1950.  It included the town centre and in terms of local government content became, after its abolition, part of west London in 1965 at which time the borough expanded further to the east and west.

Its voters returned one member (MP) to the House of Commons of the UK Parliament using the first past the post system.

Its single election was the general election of 1945, a landslide for Clement Attlee leading the Labour Party, at which the seat de facto re-elected (i.e. as incumbent) Frank Sanderson, a Conservative who had represented the seat's main forebear, Ealing.

History

The constituency was created for the 1945 general election, and abolished for the 1950 general election. The Municipal Borough of Ealing was then represented by the new Ealing North and Ealing South constituencies save for Hanwell which remained throughout in the Southall seat to the west, created in 1945.

Boundaries 
The six Municipal Borough of Ealing wards: Castlebar, Drayton, Grange Grosvenor, Lammas, Manor, and Mount Park.

Members of Parliament

Election result 

''for results of 1950–1970 elections see Ealing South

References

 

Parliamentary constituencies in London (historic)
Constituencies of the Parliament of the United Kingdom established in 1945
Constituencies of the Parliament of the United Kingdom disestablished in 1950
Politics of the London Borough of Ealing